In statistics, a generalized Wiener process (named after Norbert Wiener) is a continuous time random walk with drift and random jumps at every point in time. Formally:

where a and b are deterministic functions, t is a continuous index for time, x is a set of exogenous variables that may change with time, dt is a differential in time, and η is a random draw from a standard normal distribution at each instant.

See also 
Wiener process

Wiener process